IADT - Tampa was a for-profit college offering both bachelor and associate degrees in many different fields of study. The former Sears executive Clem Stein established the original International Academy of Design and Technology in Chicago in 1977. The Tampa location opened in 1984. IADT's holding company, Career Education Corporation, merged the school under the Sanford-Brown College name in March 2014 before closing the location a year later.

Bachelor and associate degrees
At IADT - Tampa, students could choose to earn either an associate or a bachelor's degree in four different areas of study: fashion design and marketing, interior design, graphic design or digital production. Other bachelor's degrees offered include computer animation, audio production, fashion merchandising and advertising design.

Admissions
The requirements for admission into the academy included a personal interview, a high school diploma or equivalent, and completion of an application, enrollment agreement and financial aid forms. Financial aid is available for those who qualify.

Campus
The new campus located at 3725 Grace Street, in incorporated South Tampa near suburban areas, the campus is close to the I275 on-ramp on Dale Mabry Highway. It has access to public transportation and is a few miles south of Raymond James Stadium and west of downtown Tampa. The campus is new for IADT and the full list of amenities is not yet available. Orlando Culinary Academy is a branch campus in Orlando.

Accreditation
The International Academy of Design & Technology is accredited by the Accrediting Council for Independent Colleges and Schools to award associate and bachelor's degrees. The academy's Bachelor of Fine Arts degree in interior design is accredited by the Council for Interior Design Accreditation.

Controversy
The International Academy of Design & Technology is the subject of a class action lawsuit by its students, suing for deceptive and unfair practices.

Maps
Map to the International Academy of Design & Technology-Tampa

External links
 International Academy of Design & Technology - Tampa
 IADT Schools Portal

References

Defunct private universities and colleges in Florida
Former for-profit universities and colleges in the United States
Career Education Corporation
1984 establishments in Florida
Educational institutions established in 1984
Education in Tampa, Florida
2015 disestablishments in Florida
Educational institutions disestablished in 2015